The 2010 season was Sisaket's 1st season in the top division of Thai football after promotion from the 1st division. This article shows statistics of the club's players in the season, and also lists all matches that the club played in the season.

Team kit

Chronological list of events
10 November 2009: The Thai Premier League 2010 season first leg fixtures were announced.
20 October 2010: Sisaket were relegated from the Thai Premier League after their 1st season in the Premier League.
24 October 2010: Sisaket finished in 14th place in the Thai Premier League.

Players

Current squad

First team squad
As of July 31, 2010

2010 Season transfers
In

Out

Results

Thai Premier League

League table

FA Cup

Third round

Fourth round

Quarter-final

League Cup

First round

1st Leg

2nd Leg

Second round

1st Leg

2nd Leg

References

2010
Thai football clubs 2010 season